Hoplias microlepis is a species of trahira found in Central and South America.

References

Further reading

 

Erythrinidae
Fish described in 1864
Taxa named by Albert Günther
Fish of Central America
Fish of South America